Stjärnhuset ("The Star House") was the Sveriges Television's Christmas calendar in 1981.

Plot 

Mytha, played by Sif Ruud, tells for Astro (Johannes Brost) about the constellations. Astronomy talk is mixed with stories from the Greek mythology.

Video 
The series was released to DVD on 26 October 2011.

References

External links 
  at SVT Play 
 

1981 Swedish television series debuts
1981 Swedish television series endings
Classical mythology in popular culture
Sveriges Television's Christmas calendar